Marx–Hurlburt Building are two historic commercial buildings located at Springfield, Greene County, Missouri. They were built about 1900, and are two- and three-story, rectangular Classical Revival style commercial buildings.

It was listed on the National Register of Historic Places in 2003.  It is located in the Springfield Public Square Historic District.

References

Individually listed contributing properties to historic districts on the National Register in Missouri
Commercial buildings on the National Register of Historic Places in Missouri
Neoclassical architecture in Missouri
Commercial buildings completed in 1900
Buildings and structures in Springfield, Missouri
National Register of Historic Places in Greene County, Missouri